Viktor Puskar VR I/1 ( in Viljandi – 12 April 1943 in Tartu) was an Estonian military commander (Colonel) during the Estonian War of Independence.

In 1911 he graduated from Vilnius Military Academy. Puskar participated in World War I, joining the Estonian national units in 1917. At the beginning of the Estonian War of Independence in 1918, Puskar was leader of the Järvamaa Defence League. In December he became commander of the 2nd Division. During the war he successfully defended South Estonia, expelled the Red Army from North Latvia and captured Pskov.

Puskar retired in 1920 and became a farmer. He was one of the leaders of the Vaps Movement and was in jail from 1936 to 1937, accused of underground activity. Puskar went to Germany in 1941,  returning to Estonia after the Red Army had been driven out. He died in Tartu in 1943.

See also 
Estonian War of Independence

References
 Ülo Kaevats. 2000. Eesti Entsüklopeedia 14. Tallinn: Eesti Entsüklopeediakirjastus, 

1889 births
1943 deaths
People from Viljandi
People from Kreis Fellin
Members of the Vaps Movement
Military personnel of the Russian Empire
Russian military personnel of World War I
Estonian military personnel of the Estonian War of Independence
Recipients of the Cross of Liberty (Estonia)
Recipients of the Military Order of the Cross of the Eagle, Class I
Recipients of the Order of Lāčplēsis